Royal Air Force Dallachy or more simply RAF Dallachy, is a former Royal Air Force station situated east of Elgin, Moray, Scotland. 

During the Second World War it was a fighter station, used by 18 Group RAF Coastal Command.

History

Opened in March 1943, it was originally used as a training station by No. 14 (Pilots) Advanced Flying Unit RAF, using Airspeed Oxfords. In September 1943, it was reorganised for operational use by several squadrons, including No. 144 Squadron RAF, No. 404 Squadron RCAF and No. 455 Squadron RAAF. Towards the end of 1944, it was reorganised again with No. 489 Squadron RNZAF, flying Bristol Beaufighters on shipping strikes, and No. 524 Squadron RAF with radar-equipped Vickers Wellingtons.

The airfield was closed in June 1945, becoming a Territorial Army training centre until 1958.

Units

A memorial now stands in the nearby village of Bogmoor to remember the air crews and soldiers who lost their lives in the Second World War.

Current use
The site is largely intact. However, most of the former airfield is now used by a waste recycling company. The control tower is in a ruinous state and no other buildings exist. Dallachy Aeromodellers, an active radio control model flying club, use a section.

References

Citations

Bibliography

External links

Royal Air Force stations in Scotland
Military units and formations disestablished in 1945
Defunct airports in Scotland
Airports established in 1943
Buildings and structures in Moray